Vincenzo Zitello (born 13 December 1956, Modena) is an Italian composer and harpist who specializes in original music for Celtic Harp Clarsach.

Career 
He began studying music at a very young age playing transverse flute, viola and violin and cello. He was part of the Magnetic Loom in 1975, an experimental group led by Franco Battiato with Yuri Camisasca, Roberto Mazza, lino Capra, Terra di Benedetto, and Mino De Martino. In 1977 he dedicated himself to studying and attending workshops in Breton culture and music held at the "Ti Kendalc'h" with the Breton harpists, Dominig Bouchaud and Mariannig Larc'hantec and at the same time studying classical harp with the classical artist Lisetta Paleari is also the first player and popularizer of the Celtic Cláirseach harp (metal strings) in Italy. In 1980 he studied with Alan Stivell bardic harp (Clasach) and British and Gaelic chant. In 1985 he was part of Franco Battiato's tour with Saro Cosentino, who subsequently produced, under the pseudonym of Kilim, a single by the duo published by EMI under the name 'A Sciara, with a reworking of a traditional Irish piece sung in Gaelic led to winning in 1985 the "Gondola D'Argento" International Exhibition of Light Music 1986, From a self-production, in public audio cassette "Fragments of aura amorosa", later in 1987 it will become his first solo album re-titled Et vice versa becoming the first CD and Vinyl of Celtic harp recorded and published in Italy (published by Stile Libero / Virgin) entirely composed of original pieces by Vincenzo Zitello for Cláirseach harp. In 1988 he released his second album Kerygma (Epic CBS Sony Music), presented at the Tenco Award. The album was also released in the US by the Narada (Sona Gaia) label with the title Euphonia. In 1994 he released his third album La Via published by D.D.D./BMG Ariola, then released in Europe in 1996 with the title Serenade. In 1995 wrote the music for the show The Beat Generation readings and literary reworkings by Massimo Arrigoni on the Beat Generation, with the musicians Daniele Caldarini, Federico Sanesi, Tobia Winter, Stephen James and Amelia Cuni. making a CD, presented on the occasion of the tribute to Fernanda Pivano in Conegliano Veneto where he also accompanied Allen Ginsberg in a reading and re-proposed in 2007 on the occasion of the tenth anniversary of the poet's death. 1995 he composes an Ave Maria in Latin for the Pauline Editions, which he presents live, together with the singer Rossana Casale Franco Parravicini and Federico Sanesi, in Loreto, in the presence of the Pope and 400,000 young people from all over Europe, the Ave Maria is published in a compilation of sacred music Laudate Domini published by CGD. 1997 to 2015 and artistic director from 1996 Isolabona HARPAE Festival in alternating phases until 2014, 1998 publishes his fourth album entitled Aforismi dell'Arpa, published by RTIMUSIC , Sony S4. 2000 Famiglia Cristiana publishes Easter 2000 CD Musica Caeli concert for the Jubilee, whose pieces were performed in St. Peter's Square in Rome in the presence of the Pope. 2001 publishes the CD Vincenzo Zitello Trio composed by Franco Parravicini and Federico Sanesi for the Felmay label the album Concerto recorded live at Bloom di Mezzago. 2004 the Fairyland label releases his sixth album Solo entirely played on Celtic and Baric harps (Clasach). 2006 founder of the school and of the rebirth of the Viggianese harp and director of the Viggiano harp festival, 2007 he publishes his seventh album Atlas, where he plays not only Celtic harps but also wind and string instruments. 2011 publishes his eighth album Talismano entirely dedicated to the Bardic harp (Clasach) with 12 original compositions. 2012 collaborates with Emanuela Maccarani's National Rhythmic Gymnastics. 2014 publishes his ninth album Infinito on the four seasons and elements, original pieces for strings oboe flutes Celtic harp. 2017 releases his tenth album Metamorphose XII, a double disc with 12 original songs played both with harp alone and with a twenty-one-piece orchestra. 2019 releases the eleventh album Anima Mundi, 22 songs that interpret the Major Arcana of the tarot. 2021 publishes his twelfth album Mostri e Prodigi, 8 songs inspired by the medieval bestiary.2022 releases her thirteenth album "Le voci della rosa", 10 songs inspired by Elisabetta Motta's critical contribution on nine contemporary poets. He held Master Class, at the Conservatory of Parma and Pesaro, was part of the jury of the Prix du Trophée de Harpes Camac at the Interceltique de Lorient 2010 festival and of the International Harp Sound Festival in Salsomaggiore from 2010 to 2014 and at the high school Saluzzo (Cn) in 2015 and 2016.

Discography
 1987 - Et vice versa (Virgin Dischi, SLLP 006; collana Stile Libero)
 1988 - Kerygma (Epic, 465181 1)
 1994 - La Via (DDD - La Drogueria di Drugolo, 74321 18905 2; distribuzione: BMG Ariola)
 1998 - Aforismi d'arpa (RTI S4/Sony Music, 8012842130427)
 2001 - Concerto (Live) (Felmay, FY 21750 8035 2; pubblicato come Vincenzo Zitello Trio)
 2005 - Solo (Telenn)
 2007 - Atlas (Telenn)
 2011 - Talismano (Telenn)
 2014 - Infinito (Telenn)
 2017 - Metamorphose XII (Telenn)
 2019 - Anima Mundi (Telenn)
 2021 - Mostri e Prodigi (Telenn)
 2023 - Le voci della rosa (Telenn)

Collaborations in recordings 
1979 - Francesco Magni - Il Paese dei Bugiardi
1984 - Nicola Frangione – Italic Environments Nembo Verso Nord
1986 - Alice - Park Hotel Nuvole Rosse
1987 - Ivano Fossati - La pianta del tè
1988 - Underground Life - Gloria Mundi
1990 - Quiet Force – The Maior and Miror Things
1990 - Ivano Fossati - Discanto
1991 - Mario Castelnuovo - Come sarà mio figlio
1992 - Ivano Fossati - Lindbergh
1993 - Teresa De Sio - La mappa del nuovo mondo
1993 - Ivano Fossati - Buontempo & Carte da decifrare Live Teatro Ponchielli Cremona
1993 - The Gang - Storie d’Italia
1993 - Cardinale/Parravicini - Canto D’amore
1993 - Bouchaud/Colas - Heol Dour
1994 - Dagda Morrigan - Tir na nog
1994 - Claudio Rocchi - Claudio Rocchi
1995 - Massimo Arrigoni - The Beat Generation
1995 - Casale/Zitello - Laudate Dominum
1995 - Mara - Mara
1995 - Tosca - Incontri e Passaggi
1996 - Pooh - Amici per sempre
1997 - Quartetto Borciani - Razmatazz
1998 - Gai Saber - Espirit de Frontiera
1998 - Alice - Exit
1999 - Arcari/Corsi/Salis/Dalla Porta - Il viandante immaginario
2000 - Musica Caeli - Concerto per il Giubileo
2001 - Gaspare Bernardi - L’arco Terrestre
2002 - I Luf - Ocio ai Luf
2003 - La Lionetta - Arzan
2003 - Dodi Battaglia - Assolo
2003 - Greenoch - Greenoch
2003 - Vibrarpa - Scianti
2003 - Tilion - Insolitariamente
2004 - Dino Betti Van Der Noot - Ithaca
2004 - La Sedon Salvadie - Il cielo d’Irlanda
2004 - Lou Dalfin - L’oste del Diau
2004 - Francesco Magni - Scigula
2004 - Tao Alchemic Simphony - Tao
2004 - Carmelo Salemi - A sud dell’anima
2005 - Maurizio Camardi - Impronte
2007 - Luf - So nahit’h val Camonega
2007 - Roberto Tardito - Controvento
2007 - Dino Betti Van Der Noot - The Humming cloud
2008 - Piazza/Brahms - Ashbrah
2008 - Colossus Project - The Empire & the Rebellion
2008 - Piazza/Brahms - Tiakuraka
2008 - Ivano Fossati - Musica moderna
2008 - Francesco Magni - Balada del Balabiott
2008 - Fabio Caucino - Passeggero dell’anima
2009 - Beppe Barra - N’attimo
2009 - Dino Betti Van Der Noot - God Save the Earth
2009 - Daal - Disorganicorigami
2010 - Lepricorns - La Figlia del vento
2010 - Duo MilleMiglia - A musical Journey
2010 - Girotondo D’arpe - Wandering Harps
2011 - Yo Yo Mundi - Munfra
2011 - Maura Susanna - Terra Mia
2011 - Stefano Melone e Vincenzo Zitello - Cosmos Orchestra
2012 - Dino Betti Van Der Noot - September’s New Moon
2012 - Emanuela Degli Esposti - Valse, arabesque, ballade, berceuse
2012 - Ar Nevez - Canntaireachd
2012 - Daal - Dodecahedro
2012 - Zu Gruve - Summer Vibes
2012 - Girotondo d’arpe - For Christmas
2013 - ILuf - Mat e Famat
2013 - Dino Betti Van Der Noot - Dreams Are Made On
2013 - Nichelodeon - Bath Salts
2014 - Alberto Patrucco /Andrea Mirò - Segni (e) Particolari
2015 - Girotondo D’arpe - Girotond & Friends
2015 - Leggend and Prophecy - Crohm
2015 - Partenze - Massimo Donno
2015 - Van DerNoot - Notes are but wind
2016 - Uaragniaun - Primitivo
2016 - Flo Gaggiano - Il mese del rosario
2016 - Fufluns - Spaventapasseri
2017 - Prowler - Navigli Riflessi
2017 - Massimo Priviero - All'Italia
2017 - Dino Betti Van Der Noot - Où Sont Les Notes D'Antan ?
2018 - Maurizio Geri Perle D'Appennino
2018 - Alessandro Parente - Storia di un antico Suonatore
2018 - The Magic Door
2019 - Alan Stivell Uman-Kelt
2019 - Dino Betti Van Der Noot -Two ships in the night
2020 - ZDL -Nudo
2021 - Alfio Costa Frammenti
2021 - Paola Tagliaferro Sings Greg Lake
2021 - Arthuan Rebis -Sacred Woods
2021 - Dino Betti Van Der Noot - The silence of the broken lute
2021 - Nikelodeon - Incidenti
2021 - Max Manfredi - Il grido della fata
2021 - Osanna - Il Diedro del mediterraneo
2022 - Zorama - Conteremo i fiori di un giardino
2022 - L'arcaico raggio - L'arcaico raggio
2022 - Enten Hitti - La via lattea
2023 - L'arcaico Raggio-Il signore della ruota. Ode ai quattro elementi.

External links
 Official website (in Italian)

1956 births
Living people
Italian harpists